Farhad (as Farhād) is a village in Rivand Rural District, in the Central District of Nishapur County, Razavi Khorasan Province, Iran. At the 1954 census, its population was 132, but now the population is empty.

References 

Populated places in Nishapur County